Michael Matthews is a South African writer, producer and director. In 2017, he directed Five Fingers for Marseilles, a film that won best film category at 14th Africa Movie Academy Awards.

Early life
Matthews was born in Durban. He studied filmmaking at the CityVarsity Cape Town campus.

Career 
Matthews is the director of Five Fingers for Marseilles, a film dubbed as South African first western film. At the 14th Africa Movie Academy Awards, Five Fingers for Marseilles received 10 nominations, including awards for best film, best first feature film by a director and best cinematography. The film was also nominated for Best Achievement in Directing - Feature Film at 2017 South African Film and Television Awards. For his role in the production of Apocalypse Now Now, a short film based on the book of same name, Matthews won best short film at the 12th South African Film and Television Awards. In October 2021, Matthews joined as director for the upcoming Disney film Merlin. Matthews was hired as director of Nautilus, an upcoming Disney+ series, in November 2021.

Filmography 
Short films

Feature films

Television
 Nautilus (TBA)

References

External links 
 

Living people
People from Durban
South African film directors
South African film producers
Date of birth missing (living people)
Year of birth missing (living people)